Shafiqur Rahman (born 1958) is Bangladeshi Islamic politician and Bangladesh Jamat-e-Islami Emir.

Shafiqur Rahman may refer to:

 Shafiqur Rahman (officer) (born 1962), Bangladeshi Army Officer

See also 
 Shafiqur Rahman Barq (born 1930), Indian politician 
 Shafiqur Rahaman Chowdhury (born 1957), Bangladesh Awami League politician